Alexandra Heminsley (born 1976) is a British journalist and writer, living in Brighton and Hove. She has written Running Like a Girl (2013), Leap In (2018) and Some Body to Love (2021).

Career
Heminsley worked in publishing for six years before becoming a freelance journalist and broadcaster in 2004. She was books editor and commissioning editor of Elle magazine for eight years until 2014 and for the BBC Radio 2 Arts Show with Claudia Winkleman for ten years. She has reviewed books for various newspapers and currently does so for the Sara Cox show on BBC Radio 2. She is also books editor for Grazia magazine.

Publications

Books by Heminsley
Ex and the City: You're Nobody 'til Somebody Dumps You. Pan (UK), 2007. .
Running Like a Girl: Notes on Learning to Run. London: Cornerstone, 2013. .
Leap In: a Woman, Some Waves, and the Will to Swim. London: Windmill, 2018. .
Some Body to Love: A Family Story. London: Chatto & Windus, 2021. .

Books co-written with others
Knowing the Score: My Family and Our Tennis Story. London: Chatto & Windus, 2017. With Judy Murray. .

References

External links

British writers
British journalists
British women journalists
Living people
1976 births
Place of birth missing (living people)